The MGM Grand Detroit is one of three casino resort hotels in Detroit, Michigan, and one of four in the Detroit–Windsor area. It is owned by Vici Properties and operated by MGM Resorts International. The casino opened in its temporary location on July 29, 1999. The permanent, luxury resort hotel opened on October 3, 2007 with a grand event which included models and celebrities including Ashanti, Kid Rock, and fireworks. It is the first luxury casino resort hotel in a major metropolis outside Las Vegas.

Detroit is one of the largest American cities and metropolitan regions to offer casino resort hotels.

History 

In 2005, the MGM Grand Detroit Casino was the subject of a possible sale when parent company MGM MIRAGE announced that it was acquiring rival casino company Mandalay Resort Group, owners of the MotorCity Casino. Due to Michigan state gaming laws prohibiting casino owners from acquiring or owning more than one casino in the state, MGM Mirage was forced to sell either the MGM Grand Detroit or the MotorCity casino. MGM MIRAGE had several serious buyers for the MGM Grand Detroit, but ultimately sold the MotorCity Casino to Marian Ilitch.

The facility has  of meeting space for conferences and live performance seating for 1,200. The Casino also rebuilt 3rd Street into a two way boulevard to facilitate traffic movement around the site.

The permanent casino opened to the public on October 3, 2007. The grand opening celebration attracted Hollywood stars. A Celebrity Poker Match was taped there for a televised release at a later date. The MGM Grand Detroit stands across from the DTE Energy Headquarters which includes a reflecting pool and landscaped areas.

Designers on the project include the joint venture of Hamilton Anderson Associates and the SmithGroup, both of Detroit, Cleo Design of Las Vegas, Carol Harris of Detroit, Lawrence Lee of California, Toni Chi of New York, and Super Potato out of Japan. The lead architects were Paul Tonti of the SmithGroup and Thomas Sherry of Hamilton Anderson Associates. In 2007, DTE Energy announced a major transformation of the area around its downtown headquarters into an urban oasis with parks, walkways, and a reflecting pool adjacent to the MGM Grand Detroit.

Just across the river, Caesars Windsor attracts about six million visitors annually. More than fifteen million people cross the Ambassador Bridge and the Detroit-Windsor Tunnel annually.  An estimated 46 million people live within a 300-mile (480 km) radius of Metro Detroit. Since 2000, the city has seen continuous annual increases in tax revenues from its casinos; the city estimates it will collect $178.25 million in casino taxes alone for 2007, with the casino resorts open in 2008.

Ownership of MGM Grand Detroit, along with many other MGM properties, was transferred in 2016 to MGM Growth Properties (which was later acquired by Vici Properties in 2022), while MGM Resorts continued to operate it under a lease agreement.

On May 17, 2017, Chris Cornell, the frontman of the grunge band Soundgarden was found dead with a "band around his nape of neck" in his room after performing at the Fox Theatre. Officials ruled his death a suicide by hanging.

See also 

 Hollywood Casino at Greektown
 Wikimedia graph of Detroit's casino revenues

References

External links

 

Casinos in Michigan
Casino hotels
Skyscraper hotels in Detroit
MGM Resorts International
Resorts in Michigan
Casinos completed in 2007
Hotel buildings completed in 1999
2007 establishments in Michigan
1999 establishments in Michigan
Economy of Detroit
Tourist attractions in Detroit